Jesús Alberto Valiente Briceño (born 28 August 1974) is a Venezuelan football manager and former player who played as a midfielder. He is the current manager of Trujillanos.

During his playing career, Rodríguez notably represented Trujillanos, while also playing for other teams in the country. He also played for the Venezuela national team on nine occasions, and represented the nation in the 1997 Copa América.

References

External links

1974 births
Living people
People from Trujillo (state)
Venezuelan footballers
Association football midfielders
Venezuelan Primera División players
Trujillanos FC players
Caracas FC players
Zamora FC players
Venezuela international footballers
Venezuelan football managers
Venezuelan Primera División managers
Trujillanos FC managers